Queen is a given name and surname. In some cases it originated as a shortening of the surname MacQueen. In other cases it was the nickname of an ancestor that later became the family's surname.

Given name
People with this given name include:
Queen Celestine (born 1992), Nigerian beauty queen
Queen Harrison (born 1988), American hurdler and sprinter
Queen Hazarika (born 1976), Indian playback singer and actress
Queen Latifah (born 1970), American singer, songwriter, rapper, actress, and producer
Queen Muhammad Ali, American film director
Queen Nwokoye (born 1982),  Nigerian actress
Queen Okafor (born 1987), Nigerian nurse

Surname
People with this surname include:
Alvin Queen (born 1950), Swiss jazz drummer
Ben Queen, American screenwriter
Billy Queen (baseball) (1928–2006), American baseball outfielder
Carmen Queen (1912–1974), Canadian Anglican bishop
Carol Queen (born 1958), American sexologist and writer
Caroline Queen (born 1992), American slalom canoer
Gerry Queen (born 1945), Scottish football forward
Jeff Queen (born 1946), American National Football League running back
Jenny Queen (born 1979), American singer-songwriter
Joe Sam Queen (born 1950), American politician in the North Carolina House of Representatives
Mary Jane Queen (1914–2007), American ballad singer and banjo player
Mel Queen (pitcher) (1918–1982), American baseball player
Mel Queen (pitcher/outfielder) (1942–2011), American baseball player
Monica Queen, Scottish singer
Pamela E. Queen, American politician in the Maryland General Assembly
Patrick Queen (born 1999), American football player
Richard Queen (1951–2002), American consul taken hostage during the Iran Hostage Crisis
Robin Queen, American linguist
Wendy Lee Queen (born 1981), American chemist and material scientist
William Queen, American law enforcement officer and writer
In fiction:
Ellery Queen, fictional detective created by Frederic Dannay and Manfred Bennington Lee

See also
Queen, a fictional character who appeared in the 1998 Disney/Pixar film A Bug's Life
 Queen, the well-meaning main antagonist of chapter 2 of Deltarune

References